Arbon District is one of the five districts of the canton of Thurgau in Switzerland. Its capital is the town of Arbon.

The district contains the following municipalities:

References

Districts of Thurgau